Biohazard: The Alien Force is a 1994  American film.

Cast
Chris Mitchum
Blake Pickett

Production
It was the second in a series of films Stephen Latshaw made for Fred Olen Ray. Latshaw later said it was one of his favourite films:
Because of the wonderful memories of Florida, our cast and crew, and the fact that we broke all the rules and made an action-packed sci fi adventure with 28 speaking parts, 50 locations, car chases, helicopter battles, running and jumping fights, more car chases at Universal studios, exploding lab complexes and Chris Mitchum.  And all for about $50,000.
Footage of a lab explosion wound up in two other Fred Olen Ray films.

References

External links

Biohazard The Alien Force at Bad Movies

1994 films
American science fiction films
1994 science fiction films
1990s English-language films
1990s American films